Belvoir is a  historic house at Crownsville, Anne Arundel County, Maryland.  It is a two-story, T-shaped building, constructed of brick, stone, and wood.  The home is a product of building evolution spanning the 18th, 19th, and 20th centuries. The earliest portion was probably built about 1736, but could date to the 17th century. It was the home of the grandmother of Francis Scott Key, who composed the Star Spangled Banner. Key visited in the summer in 1789.

Archaeological research is being performed on the plantation site to document the lives of slaves during the 18th and 19th centuries. A foundation from the slave quarters made of stone from the last quarter of  the 18th century was found, with many artifacts from the period when slaves lived in the building.

It was listed on the National Register of Historic Places in 1971.

References

External links
, including photo from 1969, at Maryland Historical Trust

Houses on the National Register of Historic Places in Maryland
Houses in Anne Arundel County, Maryland
Plantation houses in Maryland
Historic American Buildings Survey in Maryland
National Register of Historic Places in Anne Arundel County, Maryland
Slave cabins and quarters in the United States